Colekitchen Down is a   nature reserve north of Gomshall in Surrey. It is managed by the Surrey Wildlife Trust.

This sloping area of species-rich unimproved chalk grassland is surrounded by woodland and scrub. There is a variety of butterflies including chalkhill blue, small heath, adonis blue, gatekeeper, brimstone and marbled white.

There is no public access.

References

Surrey Wildlife Trust